Chah Gazi (also Romanized as Chāh Gazī and Chāh-e Gazī) is a village in Khuzi Rural District, Varavi District, Mohr County, Fars Province, Iran. At the 2006 census, its population was 498, in 101 families.

References 

Populated places in Mohr County